There are a number of traditionally itinerant or travelling groups in Europe who are known as "Travellers" or "Gypsies".

The origins of the indigenous itinerant groups are unclear. They have been assumed to have taken up the travelling lifestyle out of necessity at some point during the Early Modern period but to not be ethnically distinct from their source population. However, recent DNA testing has shown that the Irish Travellers are of Irish origin but are genetically distinct from their settled counterparts due to social isolation, and more groups are being studied.

Many groups speak their own language or dialect (distinct from the settled population); it is often a blend of the local settled language and Romani language, even in non-Romani groups.

The largest of these groups are the Romani people, who have Indian roots and heritage, who left India around 1,500 years ago entering Europe around 1,000 years ago; this includes the Sinti people, who are themselves the second largest group. The third largest group in Europe is the Yenish, an indigenous Germanic group.

As opposed to nomads who travel with and subsist on herds of livestock, itinerant groups traditionally travel for trade or other work for the sedentary populations amongst which they live.

Voyageurs 
Voyageurs are a Flemish group who are related to the Dutch Travellers. The first Voyageurs slept in stables and barns they encountered in the countryside along the way. It was only later that they started building covered wagons, a simple cart with a tarpaulin over it, which they pulled themselves or for which they harnessed some dogs. Even later the horses came, and the hood carts grew into caravans.

These Voyageurs obviously had their example in the nomadic way of life of mainly the Sinti. They partially adopted each other's customs, and mixed marriages were not uncommon. From this mixture of Romani and Western culture, a subculture of their own has emerged.

Many also currently live in houses, which makes tracking them difficult. In addition, some are at such an advanced stage of integration into sedentary society that they do not know or deny that they are descendants of Voyageurs, ashamed of an ancestor who walked from door to door. Their number is currently estimated at 8,000, but could be much higher. They are spread all over Flanders.

Indigenous Dutch Travellers (Woonwagenbewoners) 
They traditionally travelled around and practised traditional professions like chair bottomers, tinsmiths, broom binders, traders, peddlers, artisans, etc.

Similar to Indigenous Norwegian Travellers, Dutch Travellers are theorised to have Yenish Traveller (German Traveller) admixture.

Indigenous Norwegian Travellers (Skøyere/Fantefolk) 

Indigenous Norwegian Travellers (more commonly known as Fanter, Fantefolk or Skøyere) are an itinerant group who call themselves Reisende. Confusingly, this term is also used by Romanisæl Travellers (Tater people), the Romani group of Norway and Sweden. Unlike the Romanisæl Travellers, the indigenous Norwegian Travellers are non-Romani by culture and origins, and they do not speak any form of Romani language. Instead, their language is 'Rodi', which is a Norwegian dialect.

Similar to Indigenous Dutch Travellers, Indigenous Norwegian Travellers are theorised to have Yenish Traveller (German Traveller) admixture and possibly could be descended from them. Norwegian Rodi includes a large proportion of Yenish loanwords. Rodi also has a handful of Scandoromani loanwords due to Romanisæl Travellers and Indigenous Norwegian Travellers both living in close proximity to each other. 

Indigenous Norwegian Travellers have always concentrated around Southern and Southwestern Norway along the coastline (which was separated from the rest of Norway due to mountains) and Romanisæl Travellers have always concentrated around Central Norway (specifically in Trøndelag county around the city of Trondheim). Historically, both groups have travelled all over, and often overlap into each other's traditional areas.

They are known to the settled majority population as fant/fanter, but they prefer the term reisende ('travellers'). This term is also used by Romanisæl Travellers (the largest population of Romani people in Norway and Sweden), though the two groups are distinct. There are also groups in German-speaking countries who refer to themselves as Reisende, which is German for 'travellers'.

Eilert Sundt, a 19th-century sociologist, termed the indigenous Travellers småvandrer or småvandringer ('small travellers'), to contrast them with the Romanisæl (Tater) Travellers, which Sundt called storvandrer or storvandringer ('great travellers') who ranged further in their journeys.

Irish Travellers (Pavee)

By DNA, the Pavees are Irish, but have a separate language and culture than the settled Irish. They live predominantly in Ireland, the United Kingdom and the United States. Travellers refer to themselves as Mincéirí or Pavees in their own language or in Irish as an Lucht Siúil, meaning literally "the walking people". The language of the Irish Travellers, Shelta, is mainly based on an Irish lexicon and an English grammar. There are two dialects of this language: Gammon (or Gamin) and Cant. It has been dated back to the eighteenth century but may be older. The vast majority of Irish Travellers are Roman Catholics who maintain their traditions and culture in a close knit community of families.

In 2011 an analysis of DNA from 40 Travellers showed that Irish Travellers are a distinct Indigenous Irish ethnic minority who separated from the settled Irish community at least 1000 years ago; the claim was made that they are as distinct from the settled community as Icelanders are from Norwegians.

Like other itinerant groups they have often been racially discriminated against in the past and still are today. They were only recognised as an official ethnic group in the Republic of Ireland on March 1, 2017.

Northern Romani Travellers 
Northern Romani Traveller groups include:

 Romanichal Travellers in England (As well as North East Wales, South Wales and the Scottish Borders), with diaspora communities in the United States, Canada, South Africa, Australia and New Zealand.
 Welsh Kale Travellers in the Welsh-speaking parts of Northwestern Wales.
 Scottish Lowland Travellers in Lowland Scotland.
 Romanisæl Travellers in Central Norway and Sweden.
 Finnish Kale in Finland and parts of Sweden.

These groups have much European blood due to mixing with Indigenous Traveller groups (British Romani Travellers mix with Irish Travellers, Scottish Highland Travellers and Funfair Traveller and Scandinavian Romani Travellers mix with Indigenous Norwegian Travellers) and even non-Travellers over the centuries. This has led to these Romani groups generally looking White in appearance. 

It is also a reason why these groups speak mixed languages rather than more pure forms of Romani:

 Romanichal Travellers speak Angloromani (A mix of English and Romani).
 Romanisæl Travellers speak Scandoromani (A mix of Norwegian, Swedish and Romani).
 Scottish Lowland Travellers speak Scottish Cant (A mix of Scots and Romani).
 Welsh Kale speak Kalá (A mix of Welsh, English and Romani).
 Finnish Kale speak Kalo (A mix of Finnish and Romani).

Romani/Gypsies 

The best known itinerant community are the Romani people (also Romany, Romanies Tzigani, Rromani, and variants).
The Romani have Indo-Aryan roots and heritage and first entered Europe via the Middle East around a thousand years ago. They spread further through Europe during the 15th and 16th centuries, separating into various subgroups in the process.

They speak Romani, an Indo-Aryan language.

Indigenous Scottish Highland Travellers
Scottish Highland Travellers are also known as Ceardannan in Scottish Gaelic (which means "the craftsmen" or 'Black Tinkers') or more poetically as the "Summer Walkers". 

The Highland Traveller community has a long history in Scotland going back on record to at least the 12th century. Historically they would travel from village to village and would pitch their bow-tents on rough ground around the edge of a village and would earn money there as tinsmiths, hawkers, horse dealers or pearl-fishermen. Many found seasonal employment on farms, e.g. doing berry picking or during harvests. Nowadays the majority of Highland Travellers have settled down into organized campsites or regular houses.

The Scottish Highland Travellers have their own (nearly extinct) language based on Scottish Gaelic called Beurla Reagaird. 

Highland Travellers are closely tied to their native Highlands the native Gaelic speaking population; they may follow an itinerant or a settled lifestyle. They have played an essential role in the preservation of traditional Gaelic culture. Travellers' outstanding contribution to Highland life has been as custodians of an ancient and vital Gaelic singing, storytelling and folklore tradition of great importance. It is estimated that there are only 2,000 Highland Travellers leading their traditional lifestyle.

Yenish Travellers  

In German-speaking Europe, France and Wallonia, there are the Jenische or Yeniche (in German and French spelling, respectively).
An early description of this group was published by Johann Ulrich Schöll in 1793.

Funfair Travellers (Showmen) 

Showmen, also known as Funfair Travellers or Travelling Showpeople, are the members of families who own travelling funfairs and circuses, and are referred to as occupational travelers, who move around as part of their work. These groups formed across Europe, and included the families of travelling funfairs and circuses that required frequent mobility. These groups usually follow a set pattern of yearly nomadism. Membership of these groups has, over the years, been drawn from other communities. For example, Showmen in Great Britain and Ireland often had a mix of English, Scottish, Welsh, Irish, and/or Traveller (typically Romanichal Traveller and Irish Traveller) heritage.

As a result, Funfair Travellers are not defined as an ethnic group, even though they display certain common features, although in many countries (such as the UK) they identify as a cultural group.

Funfair Travellers often sport unique cultures and self-identity, and they tend to be insular, favouring marriage within the community, which results in long lineages and a strong sense of cultural homogeneity. For example, the Showman's Guild of Great Britain requires that applicants have a parent from the Funfair Travelling community.

Many Funfair Travellers in the fairground and circus business across Europe have partial Romani heritage, evidenced by significant traces of the Romani language and matriarchal forms of social organisation. Despite this, the roots, culture, traditions, and identity of showman groups have remained separate from Romani groups.

Camminanti 

The Camminanti are an ethnic group in Sicily, originating from the end of the 14th century. They have historically lived a nomadic life.

See also

Gypsy (term)
New Age Travellers
Nomadic peoples of Europe
Vagrancy (people)

References

Demographics of Europe
European society
Europe